The 1939 Colne Valley by-election was a parliamentary by-election held on 27 July 1939 for the British House of Commons constituency of Colne Valley.

Previous MP 
Ernest Marklew, who had been a Councillor in Grimsby, was first elected as MP for Colne Valley in 1935 when he gained the seat from the Liberal party. He died on 14 June 1939, forcing a by-election on the Labour party.

Previous Result

Candidates 
The Labour party selected 52-year-old Glenvil Hall to defend the seat. He had been Labour MP for Portsmouth Central from 1929 to 1931. 
The Liberal party selected 34-year-old Lance Mallalieu to fight the seat. He had been the MP for the seat from 1931 until defeated by Marklew at the last General Election in 1935. 
The Conservative party selected 41-year-old Cecil Pike as their new candidate. He had been Conservative MP for Sheffield Attercliffe from 1931 to 1935.

Result

Aftermath 
Hall continued as MP for Colne Valley until his death in 1962. He served as Financial Secretary to the Treasury in the 1945-50 Labour government.
Mallalieu left the Liberal party for Labour before being elected Labour MP for Brigg in 1948.
Pike did not contest another election.

References
 British Parliamentary Election Results 1918-1949, compiled and edited by F.W.S. Craig (The Macmillan Press 1979)

1939 in England
Elections in Kirklees
Colne Valley
1939 elections in the United Kingdom
By-elections to the Parliament of the United Kingdom in West Yorkshire constituencies
1930s in Yorkshire